The Home from Home Family hotel was a hotel in Kalgoorlie, Western Australia.

1934 riot 
It was one of a number of buildings that was burnt down during the riots in Kalgoorlie in 1934.

The hotel was also known at the time as Gianatti's.

The photo of the shell of the hotel is an often chosen image of the results of the riot.

The loss of the hotel and other buildings caught widespread attention, and subsequent investigation into the issues that started the riots.

Other buildings destroyed 

 The All Nations Hotel
 The Cornwall Hotel, Boulder
 Kalgoorlie Wine Saloon

See also
 Civil disturbances in Western Australia

Notes

Hotels in Kalgoorlie-Boulder
Defunct hotels in Western Australia